Abd-Allah ibn Aamir Hadhrami was the governor of the Arabic city of Kufah during the 7th century. He had a prominent role in the Battle of the Camel.

References

Iraqi politicians
7th-century Arabs
Year of death unknown
Date of birth unknown